Roberto Renzi (10 February 1923 – 23 October 2018) was an Italian cartoonist.

Biography
Renzi began writing comics in 1942 during World War II. He created titles such as Il principe nero, Scugnizzo, Il piccolo corsaro, Zan della jungla, Coyote, and Birba. In the post-war era, he created famous fictional characters such as Tiramolla and Akim. He also wrote nine stories for The Walt Disney Company Italy.

Outside of his comic book work, Renzi was an active journalist, writing a booked title Racconti mattinali (Morning stories).

He founded the Fondazione Silvio Fossati in 2007, a foundation celebrating comic book work in Italy. He also directed the Press Club in Milan.

Works
Akim
Tiramolla
Bengali
Zarawa
Fulgor
Tiramolla Elastoc
Joe Canyon
Il Piccolo Caporale

References

1923 births
2018 deaths
People from the Province of Como
Italian cartoonists